Itzamar Peña Ramírez (born February 10, 1974, in Humacao, Puerto Rico) is a Puerto Rican politician. She served as a member of the Senate of Puerto Rico from 2009 until losing her seat in the 2020 general elections. She was also Mayor of Las Piedras from 2005 to 2009.

Early years and studies

Itzamar Peña was born on February 10, 1974, in Humacao, Puerto Rico to Angel Peña Rosa and Rosalia Ramírez. Her father was Mayor of Las Piedras from 1989 until she succeeded him in 2004.

Peña obtained her bachelor's degree in Social Work from the University of Puerto Rico at Humacao, and her Juris Doctor from the University of Puerto Rico School of Law in Río Piedras.

Political career

Mayor of Las Piedras: 2005–2009

In 2004, she started her campaign for Mayor of Las Piedras. She won the party primaries in 2003 with 54.7% of the votes. The next year, she won the general elections becoming the only female Mayor elected in 2004.

Senator: 2009–2021

In 2008, Peña won a slot for Senator at the PNP primaries and eventually was elected at the general elections. She has presided the Commissions of Municipal Affairs and Civil Jury. She was vice-president of the Commissions of Public Safety and Judicial Affairs, as well as other positions.

References

External links
Hon. Itzamar Peña Ramírez on SenadoPR

1974 births
Members of the Senate of Puerto Rico
People from Humacao, Puerto Rico
Living people
21st-century American women politicians
21st-century American politicians
Women mayors of places in Puerto Rico
Mayors of places in Puerto Rico
University of Puerto Rico alumni
Puerto Rican women in politics